Show or The Show may refer to:

Competition, event, or artistic production
 Agricultural show, associated with agriculture and animal husbandry
 Animal show, a judged event in the hobby of animal fancy
 Cat show
 Dog show
 Horse show
 Specialty show, a dog show which reviews a single breed
Show, an artistic production, such as:
 Concert
 Radio show
 Talk show
 Television show
 Theatre production
 Trade fair or trade show

Arts, entertainment, and media

Films 

 The Show (1922 film), starring Oliver Hardy
 The Show (1927 film), directed by Tod Browning
 The Show (1995 film), a hip hop documentary
 The Show (2017 film), an American satirical drama
 The Show (2020 film), a British mystery film

Album
 Show, a 1993 by The Cure
 Show, a 1994 album by The Jesus Lizard
 The Show, a 2008 album by eMc
 The Show, a 2023 album by Niall Horan

Songs 

 "The Show" (Doug E. Fresh song)
 "The Show" (Girls Aloud song)
 "The Show" (Lenka song)
 "The Show" (Reddi song)
 "The Show", a song by Hawk Nelson from Smile, It's the End of the World
 "The Show", a song by Kelly Rowland (featuring Tank) from Ms. Kelly
 "The Show", a song by Tony Harnell from Cinematic
 "The Show", a song by Zion I from Chapter 4
 The Show (soundtrack), a soundtrack album from the 1995 hip hop documentary

Television 

 The Show (British TV series), a 1997 British series
 The Show (South Korean TV series), a South Korean music show

Video games 

 MLB: The Show, a series of baseball video games

Other uses in arts, entertainment, and media
 Show (film), a 2002 film
 The Show (band), an American band
 The Show (concert), a 2021 online concert by Blackpink
 Le Show, a weekly syndicated public radio show hosted by satirist Harry Shearer
 Mr. Show, a sketch comedy series
El Sonido de mi Tierra - The Great Dance of Argentina

People

Given name
 Show Hayami (born 1958), Japanese voice actor
 Show Lo (born 1979), Taiwanese singer–actor

Surname
 Eric Show (1956–1994), American baseball pitcher
 Laurie Show, a 1991 Pennsylvania murder victim
 Bobby Shows (1938–2019), American politician
 Ronnie Shows (born 1947), American politician

Nickname 

 Harold Arceneaux (born 1977), nicknamed "The Show", American professional basketball player
 Manuel Cafumana (born 1999), Angolan footballer nicknamed "Show"

Other uses
 Show, a 3G telecommunication service of Korea Telecom
 The Show (SDSU student section), the student section of the San Diego State Aztecs
 Bloody show, a term used in labour medicine
 Dog and pony show, an American idiom
 Show of hands, a voting method in deliberative assemblies

See also 
 Best in Show (disambiguation)
 Dog show (disambiguation)
 Show and tell (disambiguation)
 Showtime (disambiguation)
 
 
 The Talk Show (disambiguation)
 Talk show (disambiguation)